The Archdeacon of Anglesey was the priest in charge of the archdeaconry of Anglesey, an administrative division of the Church in Wales Diocese of Bangor. In 1844 the Archdeaconry of Anglesey was combined with the Archdeaconry of Bangor to form the Archdeaconry of Bangor and Anglesey.

In latter years the post of Archdeacon of Anglesey was held in commendam by the Bishop of Bangor.

Due to the restructuring of the Church in Wales, the post was recreated in 2018.

List of archdeacons of Anglesey
 ?–1267: Anian (afterwards Bishop of Bangor, 1267)
 c.1283–1301:  Madog ap Cynfrig (Matthew, Madog ab Crenwiz)) 
 ?–1309: Einion Sais 
 1317: Einion 
 1324: Madog ap Meurig of Anglesey 
 1328: Madog Hedwich 
 1345: John 
 ?-1368: Hywel ap Goronwy 
 1368-1395: Thomas Harborough 
 1395-1398: John ap Rhys 
 ?-1398: Walter de Swaffham  
 1405: Evan ap Bleddyn 
 ?–1410: Thomas Hywel 
 1410-1413: John Wolde 
 1413-?:  Thomas Hywel (2nd term) 
 1428, 1440: Andrew Holes 
 1446, 1452: William Saundir 
 1469–1474: William Moggys 
 1474-?: Nicholas ab Ellis 
 ?-1524: Richard Bulkeley
 1524-1537: William Glynne (died 1537)
 1537-1554: John Salisbury (John of Thetford) (Deprived of office, 1554)
 1554–?1555: Georgius Griffith
 1555–1558: William Glyn (died 1558) (also Bishop of Bangor)
 1558–1559: Griffith Robert (Deprived of office, 1559)
 ?1559–1570: John Salisbury (Reinstated in office)
 ?–1585: ?? (died 1585)
 1585–?: Owen Owen
 1588–1593: Henry Rowlands (afterwards Dean of Bangor, 1593)
 1593–1844 Post held  in commendam by the Bishop of Bangor
 1844: Archdeaconry merged with Bangor Archdeaconry - See Archdeacon of Bangor
 6 May 201824 July 2022 (ret.): Andy Herrick
1 October 2022present John Harvey

References

 
Merioneth
Merioneth